Lake Delta is a  lake in Delta Township, Michigan, just a few miles southwest of the state's capitol of Lansing, in Eaton County. Running adjacent to the lake is Interstate 96 (I-96) to the west, and Interstate 69 to the northwest.

Overview
Lake Delta features both dock and shore fishing, located south of Lansing Board of Water and Light. It has three fishing docks, on the northwest, east, and southern sections of the lake. The lake is available to local residents from April through November, depending on weather conditions.

Highways

References

Bodies of water of Eaton County, Michigan
Delta